City Point Historic District is a national historic district located at Hopewell, Virginia. The district encompasses 85 contributing buildings and 3 contributing sites at the tip of a peninsula at the confluence of the Appomattox River and James River.  The district primarily includes one- and two-story, wood-frame single-family dwellings dated to the 19th century.  Notable buildings include St. John's Episcopal Church (1840), Civil War Catholic Chapel (1865), the Cocke House (c. 1840, 1916), Miami Lodge (1912), Cook House (c. 1858), St. John's Rectory (c. 1848), and Christopher Proctor House (c. 1800).  Located in the district and separately listed is Appomattox Manor.

It was listed on the National Register of Historic Places in 1979.

References

National Register of Historic Places in Hopewell, Virginia
Federal architecture in Virginia
Historic districts on the National Register of Historic Places in Virginia
Buildings and structures in Hopewell, Virginia